The Linde–Buzo–Gray algorithm (introduced by Yoseph Linde, Andrés Buzo and Robert M. Gray in 1980) is a vector quantization algorithm to derive a good codebook.

It is similar to the k-means method in data clustering.

The algorithm 
At each iteration, each vector is split into two new vectors.

A initial state: centroid of the training sequence;
B initial estimation #1: code book of size 2;
C final estimation after LGA: Optimal code book with 2 vectors;
D initial estimation #2: code book of size 4;
E final estimation after LGA: Optimal code book with 4 vectors;

References 
 The original paper describing the algorithm, as an extension to Lloyd's algorithm:

Cluster analysis algorithms
Machine learning algorithms
Artificial neural networks